Subhi al-Tufayli (born 1948) was the first Secretary-General or leader of Hezbollah for a year. Al-Tufayli is a Shia Islamist, but is a very vocal critic of Iran and the current Hezbollah leadership. He has been an active member of the Lebanese movement Amal Movement, and maintains his support of the organization.

Early life and education

Al-Tufayli spent nine years studying theology in the city of Najaf, Iraq, during the Saddam Hussein era, where he met other Islamist clerics, and he was influenced by Lebanese cleric Musa al-Sadr. Returning to Lebanon, al-Tufayli joined with Abbas al-Musawi to help found the Shiite Islamic  group of Hezbollah in the Beqaa Valley in 1982.  Beqaa is one of Hezbollah's three main regions of support in Lebanon.

In Hezbollah
Al-Tufayli was the first Secretary-General of Hezbollah from 1989 until 1991.

Post-Hezbollah
In 1984, al-Tufayli was replaced by Abbas al-Musawi as head of Hezbollah. Hezbollah's hostage-taking campaign had wound down since the "Kuwait 17" bombers of the 1983 Kuwait bombings who were linked to leading Hezbollah members were now free, and the Taif Agreement had essentially ended the Civil War in Lebanon. Some say, al-Tufayli also opposed Hezbollah's participation in Lebanese national elections and its "moderation" toward the Lebanese state. He also disagreed with Hizbollah’s support of the Government crack down on drug cultivation. al-Tufayli himself however stated that the internal split in Hezbollah was caused by Iran's take over of Hezbollah from the original Lebanese leadership, and Iran's opposition to tactics under his leadership of violence against Israel and a demand to the end of the state of Israel; al Tufayli stated explicitly that Iran wanted to use Hezbollah as a "border guard" for Israel.

Al-Tufayli also promoted the cause against the corruption in South Lebanon, Beirut and the whole state, as Musa al-Sadr did, in his Movement of the 1970s. On 4 July 1997 he organised a protest demonstration in Baalbeck. Despite being banned and the army being deployed in attempt to prevent people attending an estimated 10,000 people took part in the demonstration. The protest received support from Zahle and Dany Chamoun. Al-Tufayli said it is "completely unacceptable that a human being could be humiliated because of poverty or because they were in need." In the autumn he organised demonstrations in sixty villages around Brital and Nabi Chit protesting neglect of rural areas and competition from imported crops. Roads were blocked with burning tyres and dumped farm produce. Around 3,000 troops were deployed and 23 protesters arrested. One of the triggers of the protest was the increase of school fees for the new academic year to $300 per child. At the time the average annual per capita income in the Beqaa valley was less than $500. Al-Tufayli advocated refusing to pay taxes and stopping repayment of UNDP soft loans.

In January 1998 al-Tufayli and MP Khadr Tulays were expelled from Hizbollah. A week later, 30 January, al-Tufayli and a group of armed men took over a school in Baalbek where Hizbollah officials were meeting. There followed a two hour shootout with the Lebanese Army which left two soldiers and three of al-Tufayli’s followers, including MP Tulays, dead. There were fifty civilian casualties including a woman killed. Al-Tufayli and around thirty gunmen succeeded in escaping to his home village, Brital. Subsequently his office in Beirut and radio station, “The Voice of the Resistance”, were closed down but al-Tufayli himself was not detained.

He created a breakaway group from Hizbollah with a more populist anti-corruption tone.

In February 2013, al-Tufayli berated Hezbollah for fighting on behalf of the Syrian government in the Syrian civil war. He said "Hezbollah should not be defending the criminal regime that kills its own people and that has never fired a shot in defense of the Palestinians". al-Tufayli added: "those Hezbollah fighters who are killing children and terrorizing people and destroying houses in Syria will go to hell". He also berated the Lebanese Army for not stopping Lebanese citizens crossing the border to fight in Syria.

He also claim that ISIS is created by Iranian and Syrian Government with help of Russia.

Views

More recently, al-Tufayli has stated that Hassan Nasrallah is implementing the agenda of the Supreme Leader of the Islamic Republic of Iran, Ali Khamenei, that the Islamic Republic's doctrine of "Rule of the Jurisprudent" (Wilayat al-Faqih) is un-Islamic and its government tyrannical. al-Tufayli claims that Hezbollah today is acting as border guards for Israel and mercenaries for Iran and the West.

See also
 Hezbollah
 Lebanon hostage crisis

References and notes

External links
Hezbollah: Between Tehran and Damascus by Gary C. Gambill and Ziad K. Abdelnour
Lebanese army hunts down radical cleric
Tufaili Returns to Lebanese Political Scene, December 1999

Hezbollah founders
Secretaries-general of Hezbollah
Lebanese Islamists
Lebanese Shia clerics
Lebanese Shia Muslims
Living people
1948 births
Islamic Dawa Party